Michael Gier (born 19 July 1967) is a Swiss competition rower and Olympic champion.

Gier and his brother Markus won a gold medal in lightweight double sculls at the 1996 Summer Olympics. The brothers also competed at the 2000 Summer Olympics in Sydney where they finished fifth.

References

1967 births
Living people
Swiss male rowers
Olympic rowers of Switzerland
Rowers at the 1996 Summer Olympics
Rowers at the 2000 Summer Olympics
Olympic gold medalists for Switzerland
Olympic medalists in rowing
Medalists at the 1996 Summer Olympics